John A. Eidsmoe is an American attorney and professor of Law emeritus. He has previously taught at the Thomas Goode Jones School of Law, Faulkner University, Montgomery, Alabama, the O. W. Coburn School of Law at Oral Roberts University and Oak Brook College of Law and Government Policy. He was in the US Air Force as a lieutenant colonel and is an Alabama State Defense Force colonel, headquarters judge advocate, deputy chaplain and training officer. He earned his J.D. from the University of Iowa, M.A. from Dallas Theological Seminary, M. Div. from Lutheran Brethren Seminary and D. Min. from O.R.U.

In a 2001 interview, Eidsmoe said, "When Biblical law conflicted with American law, O.R.U. students were generally taught that 'the first thing you should try to do is work through legal means and political means to get it changed.'" In his 1987 book, Christianity and the Constitution, Eidsmoe wrote that America "was and to a large extent still is a Christian nation" and that "our culture should be permeated with a distinctively Christian flavoring".

Eidsmoe has stirred some controversy in his outside lecturing. In 2005, he spoke to the national convention of the Council of Conservative Citizens and in 2010 he addressed an event commemorating Alabama's Secession Day where he told an interviewer that it was Alabama's "constitutional right to secede" and that "Jefferson Davis and John C. Calhoun understood the Constitution better than did Abraham Lincoln and Daniel Webster". In April 2010, he was disinvited from a Tea Party rally in Wausau, Wisconsin, because of these statements and appearances. Eidsmoe said in 2011 that he deeply despises racism, but that he will "speak to anyone".

The congresswoman and presidential candidate Michele Bachmann described Eidsmoe as  "one of the professors who had a great influence on me", "a wonderful man" and  "absolutely brilliant". She worked for him while a law student at Oral Roberts as a research assistant on Christianity and the Constitution. In 2011, he said he felt Bachmann's views were in agreement with those taught at ORU and expressed in his book that she worked on.

Eidsmoe is currently the senior counsel and resident scholar at the Foundation for Moral Law in Montgomery, Alabama. He is also an adjunct faculty member of the Institute of Lutheran Theology, in Brookings, South Dakota

References

Year of birth missing (living people)
Living people
Dominion theology
University of Iowa alumni
Oral Roberts University faculty
American legal scholars